V-League or V.League may refer to:

 V.League (Japan), a professional volleyball league
 V-League (South Korea), a professional volleyball league
 V-League (Philippines), a collegiate volleyball league
 V.League 1, a Vietnamese professional football (soccer) league
 Shakey's V-league, now the Premier Volleyball League, a Filipino women's professional volleyball league